"Banking on Me" is a song by American rapper Gunna. It was released through YSL Records and 300 Entertainment as a single on February 14, 2022. Produced by Metro Boomin and mastered by Joe LaPorta, the song was originally included on the deluxe edition of Gunna's third studio album, DS4Ever, but he took the deluxe edition down and released the song as a standalone single on Valentine's Day.

Background and composition
Gunna previewed "Banking on Me" through an Instagram story in late 2021. On January 11, 2022, he released the deluxe edition of his third studio album, DS4Ever, with the song being one of four new tracks, but removed the deluxe edition the same day. Gunna later released it as a single on Valentine's Day. Gunna raps over romantic piano lines with crudely suggestive lyrics, saying he would not want to "get tired" of his girlfriend who delivers sexual variety.

Charts

Weekly charts

Year-end charts

Certifications

References

 

 

 
2022 singles
2022 songs
Gunna (rapper) songs
Songs written by Gunna (rapper)
Songs written by Metro Boomin
Song recordings produced by Metro Boomin